Thomas Francis Burchill (August 3, 1882 – March 26, 1955) was an American businessman and politician who served one term as a United States representative from New York from 1943 to 1945.

Biography
Born in New York City, he attended the city's St. Francis Xavier High School, and graduated from Niagara University. He was an auctioneer, appraiser, and was also interested in the insurance business in New York City after 1900.

Political career 
He was a member of the New York State Assembly (New York Co., 3rd D.) in 1920, 1921, 1922, 1923 and 1924.

He was a member of the New York State Senate (13th D.) from 1925 to 1938, sitting in the 148th, 149th, 150th, 151st, 152nd, 153rd, 154th, 155th, 156th, 157th, 158th, 159th, 160th and 161st New York State Legislatures. He was appointed a member of the New York World's Fair Commission in 1938.

Congress 
Burchill was elected as a Democrat to the 78th United States Congress, holding office from January 3, 1943, to January 3, 1945. He resumed his former business pursuits in New York City and was a consultant and alien property custodian.

Death 
He died on March 26, 1955, in Far Rockaway, Queens. Interment was in Gate of Heaven Cemetery. His widow, Margaret McMahon, died in 1968.

References

External links

1882 births
1955 deaths
Politicians from New York City
Niagara University alumni
Democratic Party members of the New York State Assembly
Democratic Party New York (state) state senators
Burials at Gate of Heaven Cemetery (Hawthorne, New York)
Democratic Party members of the United States House of Representatives from New York (state)
American auctioneers
20th-century American politicians